Malikona  is a village near Baghmara, India in South Garo Hills district of Meghalaya state of India.

References

Villages in South Garo Hills district